Adam Graham Dixon (born 11 September 1986) is an English field hockey player who plays as a defender or midfielder for Beeston.

Club career
Dixon grew up in Newark-on-Trent where he played for Newark Hockey Club and went to school at Worksop College.

He plays club hockey in the Men's England Hockey League Premier Division for Beeston.
He has also played in Netherlands for HC Rotterdam.

International career
Dixon made his full international debut in May 2009 and won his 200th cap for England and GB on 21 August 2017 vs Germany. On 7 February 2019 it was announced that he had been appointed Captain of England and GB. He competed for England at the 2014 Commonwealth Games where he won a bronze medal. In June 2016 he was selected for Great Britain to compete at the 2016 Olympic Games. He was named the 2013 Player of the Year by the Hockey Writers' Club.
Dixon announced his retirement from playing International hockey after the Olympic Games in Tokyo, 2020

References

External links
Profile on England Hockey
Profile on Great Britain Hockey
 
 
 

1986 births
Living people
Sportspeople from Nottingham
Male field hockey midfielders
Male field hockey defenders
British male field hockey players
English male field hockey players
Olympic field hockey players of Great Britain
Field hockey players at the 2016 Summer Olympics
Field hockey players at the 2020 Summer Olympics
Commonwealth Games medallists in field hockey
Commonwealth Games bronze medallists for England
Field hockey players at the 2014 Commonwealth Games
Field hockey players at the 2018 Commonwealth Games
2010 Men's Hockey World Cup players
2014 Men's Hockey World Cup players
2018 Men's Hockey World Cup players
Beeston Hockey Club players
HC Rotterdam players
Men's England Hockey League players
Men's Hoofdklasse Hockey players
Expatriate field hockey players
English expatriate sportspeople in the Netherlands
Medallists at the 2014 Commonwealth Games
Medallists at the 2018 Commonwealth Games